Rencēni Parish is an administrative territorial entity of Valmiera Municipality in the Vidzeme region of Latvia.

Towns, villages and settlements of Rencēni Parish 

Parishes of Latvia
Valmiera Municipality
Vidzeme